The Z21 class (formerly L.304 class) was a class of steam locomotives built for the New South Wales Government Railways in Australia.

Wheel arrangement 
The wheel arrangement for the Z21 class was 2-6-0. Under the Whyte notation for the classification of steam locomotives, 2-6-0 represents the wheel arrangement of two leading wheels on one axle, usually in a leading truck, six powered and coupled driving wheels on three axles and no trailing wheels. This arrangement is commonly called a Mogul.

History 
The last engine was scrapped in 1941.

See also
 NSWGR steam locomotive classification

References

Railway locomotives introduced in 1885
21
Scrapped locomotives
Standard gauge locomotives of Australia